Waylon Arnold Jennings (born Wayland Arnold Jennings; June 15, 1937 – February 13, 2002) was an American singer, songwriter, musician, and actor. He pioneered the Outlaw Movement in country music.

Jennings started playing guitar at the age of eight and performed at age fourteen on KVOW radio, after which he formed his first band, The Texas Longhorns. Jennings left high school at age sixteen, determined to become a musician, and worked as a performer and DJ on KVOW, KDAV, KYTI, KLLL, in Coolidge, Arizona, and Phoenix. In 1958, Buddy Holly arranged Jennings's first recording session, and hired him to play bass. Jennings gave up his seat on the ill-fated flight in 1959 that crashed and killed Holly, J. P. "The Big Bopper" Richardson and Ritchie Valens.

Jennings then formed a rockabilly club band, The Waylors, which became the house band at "JD's", a club in Scottsdale, Arizona. He recorded for independent label Trend Records and A&M Records, but did not achieve success until moving to RCA Victor, when he acquired Neil Reshen as his manager, who negotiated significantly better touring and recording contracts. After he gained creative control from RCA Records, he released the critically acclaimed albums Lonesome, On'ry and Mean and Honky Tonk Heroes, followed by the hit albums Dreaming My Dreams and Are You Ready for the Country.

During the 1970s, Jennings drove outlaw country. With Willie Nelson, Tompall Glaser and Jessi Colter he recorded country music's first platinum album, Wanted! The Outlaws. It was followed by Ol' Waylon and the hit song "Luckenbach, Texas". He was featured on the 1978 album White Mansions, performed by various artists documenting the lives of Confederates during the Civil War. He appeared in films and television series, including Sesame Street, and a stint as the balladeer for The Dukes of Hazzard, composing and singing the show's theme song and providing narration for the show. By the early 1980s, Jennings struggled with cocaine addiction, which he overcame in 1984. Later, he joined the country supergroup The Highwaymen with Willie Nelson, Kris Kristofferson, and Johnny Cash, which released three albums between 1985 and 1995. During that period, Jennings released the successful album Will the Wolf Survive.

Jennings toured less after 1997 to spend more time with his family. Between 1999 and 2001, his appearances were limited by health problems. In 2001, he was inducted into the Country Music Hall of Fame. In 2007, he was posthumously awarded the Cliffie Stone Pioneer Award by the Academy of Country Music.

Early life 

Wayland Jennings was born on June 15, 1937, on the J.W. Bittner farm, near Littlefield, Texas. He was the son of Lorene Beatrice (née Shipley, 1920–2006) and William Albert Jennings (1915–1968). The Jennings family line descended from Irish and Black-Dutch. The Shipley line descended from his great-grandfather, a farmer and lawman from Tennessee, with Jennings adding that "along the way, a lot of Indian blood mixed in," including Cherokee and Comanche families.

The name on Jennings's birth certificate was Wayland. It was changed after a Baptist preacher visited his parents and congratulated his mother for naming him after the Wayland Baptist University in Plainview, Texas. Lorene Jennings, who was Church of Christ and had been unaware of the college, changed the spelling to Waylon. Jennings later expressed in his autobiography, "I didn't like Waylon. It sounded so corny and hillbilly, but it's been good to me, and I'm pretty well at peace with it now." After working as a laborer on the Bittner farm, Jennings's father moved the family to Littlefield and established a retail creamery.

Career

Beginnings in music 
When Jennings was 8, his mother taught him to play guitar with the tune "Thirty Pieces of Silver". Jennings used to practice with his relatives' instruments until his mother bought him a used Stella guitar, and later ordered a Harmony Patrician. Early influences included Bob Wills, Floyd Tillman, Ernest Tubb, Hank Williams, Carl Smith, and Elvis Presley.

Beginning with performing at family gatherings, Jennings played his first public concert at the Youth Center with Anthony Bonanno, followed by appearances at the local Jaycees and Lions Clubs. He won a talent show at Channel 13, in Lubbock, singing "Hey Joe". He later made frequent performances at the Palace Theater in Littlefield, during local talent night.

At the age of 14, Jennings auditioned for a spot on KVOW in Littlefield, Texas. Owner J.B. McShan, along with Emil Macha, recorded Jennings's performance. McShan liked his style and hired him for a weekly 30-minute program. Following his performance on the show, Jennings formed his own band. He asked Macha to play bass for him and gathered other friends and acquaintances to form The Texas Longhorns. The style of the band—a mixture of Country and Western and Bluegrass music—was often not well received.

After several disciplinary infractions, 16-year-old Jennings was convinced to drop out of Littlefield High School by the superintendent. Upon leaving school, he worked for his father in the family store, while he also took temporary jobs. Jennings felt that music would turn into his career. The next year he, along with The Texas Longhorns, recorded demo versions of the songs "Stranger in My Home" and "There'll Be a New Day" at KFYO radio in Lubbock. Meanwhile, he drove a truck for the Thomas Land Lumber Company, and a cement truck for the Roberts Lumber Company. Tired of the owner, Jennings quit after a minor driving accident. Jennings, and other local musicians, often performed at country radio station KDAV.  During this time he met Buddy Holly at a Lubbock restaurant. The two often met during local shows, and Jennings began to attend Holly's performances on KDAV's Sunday Party.

In addition to performing on air for KVOW, Jennings started to work as a DJ in 1956 and moved to Lubbock. His program ran from 4:00 in the afternoon to 10:00 in the evening, filled with two hours of country classics, two of current country and two of mixed recordings. The latter included early rock-and-roll stars such as Chuck Berry and Little Richard. The owner reprimanded Jennings for his selection, and after playing two Little Richard records in a row Jennings was fired.

During his time at KVOW Jennings was visited by DJ Sky Corbin of KLVT in Levelland. Corbin was impressed with his voice, and decided to visit Jennings at the station after hearing him sing a jingle to the tune of Hank Snow's "I'm Moving On". Jennings expressed his struggle to live on a $50-a-week salary. Corbin invited Jennings to visit KLVT, where he eventually took Corbin's position when it opened. The Corbin family later purchased KLLL, in Lubbock. They changed the format of the station to country, becoming the main competition of KDAV. The Corbins hired Jennings as the station's first DJ.

Jennings produced commercials and created jingles with the rest of the DJs. As their popularity increased, the DJs made public appearances. Jennings's events included live performances. During one performance, Holly's father, L.O. Holley, approached them with his son's latest record and asked them to play it at the station. L.O. mentioned his son's intention to start producing artists himself, and Corbin recommended Jennings. After returning from his tour of England Buddy Holly visited KLLL.

Holly took Jennings as his first artist. He outfitted him with new clothes, and worked with him to improve his image. He arranged a session for Jennings at Norman Petty's recording studios in Clovis, New Mexico. On September 10, Jennings recorded the songs "Jole Blon" and "When Sin Stops (Love Begins)" with Holly and Tommy Allsup on guitars and saxophonist King Curtis. Holly then hired Jennings to play bass for him during his "Winter Dance Party Tour".

Winter Dance Party Tour 

Before the tour, Holly vacationed with his wife in Lubbock and visited Jennings's radio station in December 1958. Jennings and Sky Corbin performed the hand claps to Holly's tune "You're the One". Jennings and Holly soon left for New York City, arriving on January 15, 1959. Jennings stayed at Holly's apartment by Washington Square Park prior to a meeting scheduled at the headquarters of the General Artists Corporation, that organized the tour. They later took a train to Chicago to join the band.

The Winter Dance Party tour began in Milwaukee, Wisconsin, on January 23, 1959. The amount of travel created logistical problems, as the distance between venues had not been considered when scheduling each performance. Adding to the problem, the unheated tour buses twice broke down in freezing weather, leading to drummer Carl Bunch being hospitalized for frostbite on his toes. Holly made the decision to find another means of transportation.

Before their performance at the Surf Ballroom in Clear Lake, Iowa, Holly chartered a four-seat Beechcraft Bonanza airplane from Dwyer Flying Service in Mason City, Iowa, for himself, Jennings, and Tommy Allsup, to avoid the long bus trip to their next venue in Moorhead, Minnesota. Following the Clear Lake show (which ended around midnight), Allsup lost a coin toss and gave up his seat on the charter plane to Ritchie Valens, while Jennings voluntarily gave up his seat to J. P. Richardson, known as The Big Bopper, who was suffering from the flu and complaining about how cold and uncomfortable the tour bus was for a man of his size.

When Holly learned that his bandmates had given up their seats on the plane and had chosen to take the bus rather than fly, a friendly banter between Holly and Jennings ensued, and it would come back to haunt Jennings for decades to follow: Holly jokingly told Jennings, "Well, I hope your ol' bus freezes up!" Jennings jokingly replied, "Well, I hope your ol' plane crashes!" Less than an hour and a half later, shortly after 1:00 am on February 3, 1959, Holly's charter plane crashed into a cornfield outside Mason City, instantly killing all on board.

Later that morning, Jennings's family heard on the radio that "Buddy Holly and his band had been killed." After calling his family, Jennings called Sky Corbin at KLLL from Fargo to confirm that he had not been aboard the plane. The General Artists Corporation promised to pay for first-class tickets for Jennings and the band to attend Holly's funeral in Lubbock in exchange for them playing that night in Moorhead. After the first show, they were initially denied their payment by the venue, but after Jennings's persistence, they were paid. The flights were never paid for, and Jennings and Allsup continued the tour for two more weeks, featuring Jennings as the lead singer. They were paid less than half of the original agreed salary, and upon returning to New York, Jennings put Holly's guitar and amplifier in a locker in Grand Central Terminal and mailed the keys to Maria Elena Holly. Then he returned to Lubbock.

In the early 1960s, Jennings wrote and recorded "The Stage (Stars in Heaven)", a tribute to Valens, the Big Bopper and Holly, as well as Eddie Cochran, a young musician who died in a road accident a year after the plane crash.

For decades afterward, Jennings repeatedly stated that he felt responsible for the crash that killed Holly. This sense of guilt precipitated bouts of substance abuse through much of his career.

"Jole Blon" was released on Brunswick in March 1959 with limited success. Now unemployed, Jennings returned to KLLL. Deeply affected by the death of Holly, Jennings's performance at the station worsened. He left the station after he was denied a raise, and later worked briefly for the competition, KDAV.

Phoenix 

Due to his father-in-law's illness, Jennings had to shuttle between Arizona and Texas. While his family lived back in Littlefield, Jennings found a job briefly at KOYL in Odessa, Texas. He moved with his family to Coolidge, Arizona, where his wife Maxine's sister lived. He found a job performing at the Galloping Goose bar, where he was heard by Earl Perrin, who offered him a spot on KCKY. Jennings also played during the intermission at drive-in theaters and in bars. After a successful performance at the Cross Keys Club in Phoenix, he was approached by two contractors (Paul Pristo and Dean Coffman) who were building a club in Scottsdale for James (Jimmy) D. Musil, called JD's. Musil engaged Jennings as his main artist and designed the club around his act.

Jennings formed his backing band, The Waylors, with bassist Paul Foster, guitarist Jerry Gropp, and drummer Richie Albright. The band soon earned a strong local fan base at JD's, where Jennings developed his rock-influenced style of country music that defined him on his later career.

In 1961, Jennings signed a recording contract with Trend Records, and experienced moderate success with his single, "Another Blue Day". His friend Don Bowman took demos of Jennings to Jerry Moss, who at the time was starting A&M Records with associate Herb Alpert. In July 1963 Jennings signed a contract with A&M that granted him 5% of record sales. At A&M, he recorded "Love Denied" backed with "Rave On", and Ian Tyson's "Four Strong Winds" backed with "Just to Satisfy You". He followed up by recording demos of "The Twelfth of Never", "Kisses Sweeter than Wine", and "Don't Think Twice, It's All Right", and also produced the single "Sing the Girls a Song, Bill", backed with "The Race Is On". The singles were released between April and October 1964.

Jennings's records found little success at A&M, because the label was releasing mostly folk music rather than country at the time. He had a few regional hits around Phoenix, due to local radio airplay with  "Four Strong Winds" and "Just To Satisfy You", which was co-written with Bowman. Meanwhile, he recorded an album on BAT records produced by James Musil and engineered by Jack Miller, called "JD's Waylon Jennings" on the front of the album, and "Waylon Jennings at JD's" on the back side. After 500 copies were sold at the club another 500 were pressed by the Sounds label. He also played lead guitar for Patsy Montana on a 1964 album.

Singer Bobby Bare heard Jennings's "Just to Satisfy You" on his car radio while passing through Phoenix, and recorded it and "Four Strong Winds". After stopping in Phoenix to attend a Jennings performance at JD's, Bare called Chet Atkins, head of the RCA Victor studios in Nashville, and suggested he sign Jennings. Unsure after being offered a deal with RCA if he should quit his gig at JD's and relocate to Nashville, he sought the advice of RCA artist and friend Willie Nelson, who had attended one of Jennings' shows. Upon hearing how well financially Jennings was doing at JD's Nelson suggested he stay in Phoenix.

Jennings then asked Herb Alpert to release him from his contract with A&M, which Alpert did. Later, after Jennings became successful, A&M compiled all of his singles and unreleased recordings and issued them as an album, Don't Think Twice. Atkins formally signed Jennings to RCA Victor in 1965. In August Jennings made his first appearance on Billboard's Hot Country Songs chart with "That's the Chance I'll Have to Take".

The Nashville Sound

In 1966, Jennings released his debut RCA Victor album Folk-Country, followed by Leavin' Town and Nashville Rebel. Leavin' Town resulted in significant chart success as the first two singles "Anita, You're Dreaming" and "Time to Bum Again" both peaked at number 17 on the Billboard Hot Country Songs chart. The album's third single, a cover of Gordon Lightfoot's "(That's What You Get) For Lovin' Me", peaked at no. 9, Jennings's first top 10 single. Nashville Rebel was the soundtrack to an independent film, The Nashville Rebel, starring Jennings. The single "Green River" charted on Billboard country singles at no. 11.

In 1967, Jennings released a hit single, "Just to Satisfy You". During an interview, Jennings remarked that the song was a "pretty good example" of the influence of his work with Buddy Holly and rockabilly music. Jennings produced mid-chart albums that sold well, including 1967's Just to Satisfy You, which included the hit single. Jennings's singles enjoyed success. "The Chokin' Kind" peaked at number eight on Billboard's Hot Country Singles in 1967, while "Only Daddy That'll Walk the Line" hit number two the following year. In 1969, his collaboration with The Kimberlys on the single "MacArthur Park" earned a Grammy Award for Best Country Performance by a Duo or Group. His single "Brown Eyed Handsome Man" reached number three at the Hot Country Singles chart by the end of the year.

During this time, Jennings rented an apartment in Nashville with singer Johnny Cash. Jennings and Cash were both managed by "Lucky" Moeller's booking agency Moeller Talent, Inc. The tours organized by the agency were unproductive, with the artists being booked to venues located far from each other in close dates. After paying for the accommodation and travel expenditures, Jennings was frequently forced to request advances from the agency or RCA Victor to make the next venue. While playing 300 days on the road, Jennings's debt increased, and along with it his consumption of amphetamine. He believed himself to be "trapped on the circuit".

In 1972, Jennings released Ladies Love Outlaws. The single that headlined the album became a hit for Jennings, and was his first approach to outlaw country. Jennings was accustomed to performing and recording with his own band, The Waylors, a practice that was not encouraged by powerful Nashville producers, who favored the Nashville sound produced by a roster of experienced local studio musicians. The music style publicized as "Countrypolitan" was characterized by orchestral arrangements and the absence of most traditional country music instruments. The producers did not let Jennings play his own guitar or select material to record. Jennings felt limited by Nashville's lack of artistic freedom.

Outlaw Country 

In an interview Jennings recalled the restrictions of the Nashville establishment: "They wouldn't let you do anything. You had to dress a certain way: you had to do everything a certain way.... They kept trying to destroy me.... I just went about my business and did things my way.... You start messing with my music, I get mean." 

By 1972, after the release of Ladies Love Outlaws, his recording contract was nearing an end. Upon contracting hepatitis, Jennings was hospitalized. Sick and frustrated with the Nashville music industry, he was considering retirement. Albright visited him and convinced him to continue, suggesting he hire Neil Reshen as his new manager. Meanwhile, Jennings requested a $25,000 royalty advance from RCA Records to cover his living expenses during his recovery. The same day he met Reshen, RCA sent Jerry Bradley to offer Jennings $5,000 as a bonus for signing a new 5% royalty deal with RCA, the same terms he had accepted in 1965. After reviewing the offer with Reshen, he rejected it and hired Reshen.

Reshen started to renegotiate Jennings's recording and touring contracts. At a meeting in a Nashville airport Jennings introduced Reshen to Willie Nelson. By the end of the meeting Reshen had become Nelson's manager as well. Jennings's new deal included a $75,000 advance and artistic control. Reshen advised Jennings to keep the beard that he had grown in the hospital, to match the image of Outlaw Country.

By 1973 Nelson found success with Atlantic Records. Now based in Austin, Texas, he began to attract rock and roll fans to his shows, which gained him notice in its press. Atlantic Records made a bid to sign Jennings, but Nelson's rise to popularity persuaded RCA to renegotiate with him before losing another potential star.

In 1973, Jennings released Lonesome, On'ry and Mean and Honky Tonk Heroes, the first albums recorded and released under his creative control. This heralded a major turning point for Jennings, resulting in his most critically and commercially successful years. More hit albums followed with This Time and The Ramblin' Man, both released in 1974. The title tracks of both albums topped the Billboard Country singles chart, with the self-penned "This Time" becoming Jennings's first no. 1 single. Dreaming My Dreams, released in 1975, included the no. 1 single "Are You Sure Hank Done It This Way", and became his first album to be certified gold by the RIAA; it was also the first of six consecutive solo studio albums to be certified gold or higher. In 1976 Jennings released Are You Ready for the Country. Jennings wanted Los Angeles producer Ken Mansfield to produce the record, but RCA initially balked. Jennings and The Waylors traveled to Los Angeles and recorded with Mansfield at Jennings's own expense. A month later, Jennings returned to Nashville and presented the master tape to Chet Atkins, who, after listening to it, decided to release it. The album reached number 1 Billboards country albums three times the same year, topping the charts for 10 weeks. It was named Country album of the year in 1976 by Record World magazine and was certified gold by the RIAA.

In 1976, RCA released the compilation album Wanted! The Outlaws, with Jennings, Willie Nelson, Tompall Glaser, and Jennings's wife, Jessi Colter. The album was the first Country music album certified platinum. The following year, RCA issued Ol' Waylon, an album that produced a hit duet with Nelson, "Luckenbach, Texas". The album Waylon and Willie followed in 1978, producing the hit single "Mammas Don't Let Your Babies Grow Up to Be Cowboys". Jennings released I've Always Been Crazy, also in 1978. The same year, at the peak of his success, Jennings began to feel limited by the outlaw movement. Jennings referred to the overexploitation of the image in the song "Don't You Think This Outlaw Bit's Done Got Out of Hand?", claiming that the movement had become a "self-fulfilling prophecy". In 1979, RCA released Jennings first Greatest Hits compilation, which was certified gold the same year, and quintuple platinum in 2002.

Also in 1979, Jennings joined the cast of the CBS series The Dukes of Hazzard as the Balladeer, the narrator. The only episode to feature him as an actor was "Welcome, Waylon Jennings", during the seventh season. Jennings played himself, presented as an old friend of the Duke family. For the show he also wrote and sang the theme song "Good Ol' Boys", which became the biggest hit of his career. Released as a single in promotion with the show, it became Jennings's 12th single to reach number one on the Billboard Country Singles chart. It was also a crossover hit, peaking at no. 21 on the Billboard Hot 100.

Later years 

In the mid-1980s, Johnny Cash, Kris Kristofferson, Willie Nelson, and Jennings formed a successful group called The Highwaymen. Aside from his work with The Highwaymen, Jennings released a gold album WWII (1982) with Willie Nelson.

In 1985, Jennings joined with USA for Africa to record "We Are the World", but he left the studio because of a dispute over the song's lyrics that were to be sung in Swahili. By this time, his sales had decreased. After the release of Sweet Mother Texas, Jennings signed with MCA Records. His debut release with the label, Will the Wolf Survive (1985), peaked at number one in Billboard's Country albums in 1986. Jennings's initial success tailed off, and in 1990, he signed with Epic Records. His first release, The Eagle, became his final top 10 album.

Also in 1985, he made a cameo appearance in the live-action children's film Sesame Street Presents: Follow That Bird. In the movie, he plays a turkey farm truck driver who gives Big Bird a lift. He also sings one of the film's songs, entitled "Ain't No Road Too Long". In 1993, in collaboration with Rincom Children's Entertainment, Jennings recorded an album of children's songs, Cowboys, Sisters, Rascals & Dirt, which included "Shooter's Theme", a tribute to his 14-year-old with the theme of "a friend of mine".

As his record sales and radio play declined through the 1990s, Jennings continued to draw large crowds to his live performances. in 1994 Jennings made a small appearance in the movie Maverick, with Mel Gibson, Jodie Foster, and James Garner.

In 1996, Jennings released his album, Right for the Time. In 1997, after the Lollapalooza tour, he decreased his tour schedule to focus on his family. In 1998, Jennings teamed up with Bare, Jerry Reed, and Mel Tillis to form the Old Dogs. The group recorded a double album of songs by Shel Silverstein.

In mid-1999, Jennings assembled what he referred to as his "hand-picked dream team" and formed Waylon & The Waymore Blues Band. Consisting primarily of former Waylors, the 13-member group performed concerts from 1999 to 2001. As his health declined, Jennings decided to end his touring career. In January 2000, Jennings recorded what became his final album at Nashville's Ryman Auditorium, Never Say Die: Live.

Music style and image 

Jennings's music was characterized by his powerful rough-edged singing voice, phrasing and texture.
He was also recognized for his "spanky-twang" guitar style. To create his sound, he used a pronounced 'phaser' effect (see 'Modulation Effects': below) plus a mixture of thumb and fingers during the rhythmic parts, while using picks for the lead runs. He combined hammer-on and pull-off riffs, with eventual upper-fret double stops and modulation effects. Jennings played a 1953 Fender Telecaster, a used guitar that was a gift from The Waylors. Jennings's bandmates adorned his guitar with a distinctive leather cover that featured a black background with a white floral work. Jennings further customized it by filing down the frets to lower the strings on the neck to obtain the slapping sound. Among his other guitars, Jennings used a 1950 Fender Broadcaster from the mid-1970s, until he gave it to guitarist Reggie Young in 1993. The leather covers of his guitars were carved by leather artist Terry Lankford.

Jennings's signature image was characterized by his long hair and beard, and black hat and black leather vest he wore during his appearances.

Personal life 

Jennings was married four times and had six children. He married Maxine Caroll Lawrence in 1956 at age 18, with whom he had four children: Terry Vance (1957–2019), Julie Rae (1958–2014), Buddy Dean (born 1960), and Deana. Jennings married Lynne Jones on December 10, 1962, adopting a child, Tomi Lynne. They divorced in 1967. He married Barbara Elizabeth Rood the same year. He composed the song "This Time" about the trials and tribulations of his marriages and divorces. 

Jennings married country singer Jessi Colter in Phoenix, Arizona, on October 26, 1969. Colter had a daughter, Jennifer, from her previous marriage to Duane Eddy. The couple had a son born in 1979, Waylon Albright, known as Shooter Jennings. In the early 1980s, Colter and Jennings nearly divorced due to his abuse of drugs and alcohol. In 1997, after he stopped touring, Jennings earned a GED at age 60 to set an example about the importance of education to his son, Shooter.

Addiction and recovery 
Jennings started to consume amphetamines while he lived with Johnny Cash during the mid-1960s. Jennings later stated, "Pills were the artificial energy on which Nashville ran around the clock."

In 1977, Jennings was arrested by federal agents for conspiracy and possession of cocaine with intent to distribute. A private courier warned the Drug Enforcement Administration about the package sent to Jennings by a New York colleague that contained 27 grams of cocaine. The DEA and the police searched Jennings's recording studio but found no evidence because, while they were waiting for a search warrant, Jennings disposed of the drug. The charges were later dropped and Jennings was released. The episode was recounted in Jennings's song "Don't You Think This Outlaw Bit's Done Got Out of Hand".

During the early 1980s, his cocaine addiction intensified. Jennings claimed to have spent $1,500 a day on his habit, draining his personal finances and leaving him bankrupt with debt up to $2.5 million. Though he insisted on repaying the debt and did additional tours to do so, his work became less focused and his tours deteriorated. Jennings leased a home in the Phoenix area and spent a month detoxing himself, intending to start using cocaine again in a more controlled fashion afterward. In 1984, he quit cocaine. He claimed that his son Shooter was his main inspiration to finally do so.

Illness and death 

Decades of excessive smoking and drug use took a large toll on Jennings' health in addition to obesity and a poor diet, which resulted in his developing Type II diabetes. In 1988, four years after quitting cocaine, he ended his six-pack-a-day smoking habit. That same year, he underwent heart bypass surgery. By 2000, his diabetes worsened, and the pain reduced his mobility to the point where he was forced to end most touring. That same year, he underwent surgery to improve his left leg's blood circulation. In December 2001, his left foot was amputated at a hospital in Phoenix.

On February 13, 2002, Jennings died in his sleep from complications of diabetes at his home in Chandler, Arizona, aged 64. He was buried in the City of Mesa Cemetery in nearby Mesa. At his memorial service on February 15, Jessi Colter sang "Storms Never Last".

Legacy 
Between 1965 and 1991, ninety-six Jennings singles appeared on Billboard's Hot Country Singles chart and sixteen topped it. Between 1966 and 1995 fifty-four of his albums charted on Billboard's Top Country Albums, with eleven reaching Number 1.

Littlefield, Texas, renamed one of its major roads, Tenth Street, to Waylon Jennings Boulevard.
He was inducted to the Texas Country Music Hall of Fame in 1999.

In October 2001, Jennings was inducted into the Country Music Hall of Fame, but he was unable to attend the ceremony due to the pain caused by his diabetes. On July 6, 2006, Jennings was inducted to Guitar Center's RockWalk in Hollywood, California. Jessi Colter attended the ceremony along with Kris Kristofferson, who was inducted on the same day. On June 20, 2007, Jennings was posthumously awarded the Cliffie Stone Pioneer Award by the Academy of Country Music. During the ceremony, Ray Scott sang "Rainy Day Woman" and the award was accepted by Buddy Jennings.

Jennings's music had an influence on numerous artists, including Hank Williams Jr., The Marshall Tucker Band, Travis Tritt, Steve Earle, Waylon, Eric Church, Cody Jinks, Jamey Johnson, John Anderson, his son, Shooter Jennings, Sturgill Simpson, and Hank Williams III.

In 2008, the posthumous album Waylon Forever was released, which consisted of songs recorded with his then-16-year-old son, Shooter. In 2012, the three-volume Waylon: The Music Inside was released, featuring covers of Jennings's songs by different artists. Also released the same year was Goin' Down Rockin': The Last Recordings, a set of 12 songs recorded by Jennings and bassist Robby Turner before Jennings' death in 2002.  The songs initially featured only Jennings' guitar and vocals, with Turner on bass; further accompaniment was to be added later. Turner completed the recordings in 2012 with the help of former Waylors. The Jennings family approved the release. Meanwhile, it launched a new business focused on his estate. Shooter Jennings arranged deals for a clothing line, launched a renewed website, and started talks with different producers on a biographical film.

Discography

Filmography

Awards

See also 

 Jerry "Bo" Coleman
 Outlaw Country
 List of country musicians
 List of best-selling music artists
 Inductees of the Country Music Hall of Fame

References

Sources

Further reading 
 Denisoff, R. Serge. Waylon: A Biography (1983). Knoxville: University of Tennessee Press. .
 Smith, John L. (compiled by) The Waylon Jennings Discography (1995). Greenwood Press. .
 Cunniff, Albert. Waylon Jennings (1985). Zebra Books..

External links 

 Waylon Jennings: February 15, 2002 – Fresh Air from WHYY (RealAudio)
 USA Today obituary
 

1937 births
2002 deaths
20th-century American bass guitarists
20th-century American pianists
20th-century American singers
20th-century American male singers
A&M Records artists
American amputees
American country bass guitarists
American country guitarists
American country pianists
American country singer-songwriters
American male actors
American male bass guitarists
American male pianists
American male singer-songwriters
American mandolinists
American people of Cherokee descent
American people of Comanche descent
American people of Dutch descent
American people of Irish descent
American radio DJs
American rock bass guitarists
American rock guitarists
American rockabilly guitarists
Burials in Arizona
Country Music Hall of Fame inductees
Country musicians from Arizona
Country musicians from Texas
Deaths from diabetes
Epic Records artists
Grammy Award winners
Guitarists from Arizona
Guitarists from Texas
Jennings family
MCA Records artists
Musicians from Phoenix, Arizona
Outlaw country singers
People from Coolidge, Arizona
People from Littlefield, Texas
Radio personalities from Texas
RCA Victor artists
Singer-songwriters from Texas
South Plains College alumni
Stockfisch Records artists
The Dukes of Hazzard
The Highwaymen (country supergroup) members
Old Dogs members
Singer-songwriters from Arizona